The Glebe of Shelburne Parish is a house built  as a glebe in rural Loudoun County, Virginia around 1775 to attract a cleric to preach in the Shelburne Parish of the Anglican Church. Shelburne Parish, named for the Earls of Shelburne, desired in 1771 that a minister preach at Leesburg, Virginia every three months. The absence of a glebe and glebe lands detracted from efforts to recruit a parson, so in 1773 the parish purchased  and built a house on the property.

The two-story brick house stands on a hilltop overlooking Goose Creek. There are five bays, of which two may have been added. A two-bay kitchen wing is appended. The interior may not have been completed until after the American Revolution, as its detailing is Greek Revival in character. The property includes a number of outbuildings, including an ice house and a kitchen.

Virginia ordered the sale of all glebes in 1802, but the parish resisted.  Legal action was not settled until 1830, and the property was finally sold in 1840. It was placed on the National Register of Historic Places on April 1, 1975. The Shelburne Glebe is contained within the larger Goose Creek Historic District, a rural landscape.

References

Properties of religious function on the National Register of Historic Places in Virginia
Houses completed in 1775
National Register of Historic Places in Loudoun County, Virginia
Houses in Loudoun County, Virginia